Van Hien University is a university located in District 3, Ho Chi Minh City, Vietnam. It is a private university established in 1997. Van Hien University presently has nine faculties: Tourism, Cultural Research, IT, Telecommunication and Electronics, Business Administration, Foreign Languages, Social Research, Literature.

Founded in accordance with Decision No 517/TTg by the Prime Minister in 1997, after ten years of development Van Hien has gone from being a non-State-run training foundation specializing in Sociology and Humanity to being a University with  diversified disciplines and different academic degrees. Van Hien University is a member of V.U.N. and of Non-Government College and University Association.

The teaching staff consists of 300 lecturers, including visiting lecturers from famous universities in HCMC such as Pedagogy University, Polytechnic University, University of Economics, University of Sociology and Humanity.

Students at the University receive both scientific knowledge and practical instruction. Currently, Van Hien is setting up an  inter-University training program with a view to help the students have more academic opportunities to study and gain knowledge.

In 2007, Van Hien University finalized the procedures to erect the new campus on Avenue Nguyen Van Linh, close to Dist. 7. It covers an area of 63,000 m2 with a modern facility of lecture-halls, labs, libraries, gymnastic halls, entertainment compound, meetingthe requirements of more than 10,000 students.

External links
 Official Website (Vietnamese language only)
 Official Website

Universities in Ho Chi Minh City